Anacranae is a genus of grasshoppers in the subfamily Catantopinae and tribe Gereniini.  Species can be found in Indo-China, including peninsular Malaysia, where the type species is found.

Species 
The Orthoptera Species File. lists:
 Anacranae beybienkoi Storozhenko, 2005 - Thailand
 Anacranae gorochovi Storozhenko, 2002 - Vietnam
 Anacranae nuda Miller, 1934 - type species - locality Selangor, Malaysia
 Anacranae vietnamensis Storozhenko, 2002 - Vietnam

References

External links 
 Images at iNaturalist
 

Acrididae genera
Catantopinae
Orthoptera of Asia
Orthoptera of Indo-China